Qiji (863 - 937), also known by his art name Hengyue Shamen, was a Tang dynasty Chinese Buddhist monk and poet. Qiji wrote more than 852 poems, after Li Bai (701-762), Du Fu (712-770), Bai Juyi (772-846), Yuan Zhen (779-831), he ranks at the fifth position in terms of numbers of poems within the Tang poets. He was one of the big three of Tang dynasty poetmonks, along with Guanxiu (832-912) and Jiaoran (730-799).

Biography
Qiji was born Hu Desheng in 863, in Zuta Village, Weishan Township, Ningxiang, Hunan, to a family of tenant farmers. At the age of 6, he learned writing while grazed cattle for the Tongdu Temple on the mountain. He took refuge in the Three Jewels (became a monk) under Yangshan Huiji (807-883). As Adult, he went out to study and travelled to Yueyang, Changan, Zhongnan Mountains, Mount Huashan, and Jiangxi. When he returned to Changsha, Xu Dongye, a poet in the office of Hunan military governor, said: "The poems we write are not good enough. We can't compare the poems you write."

In 921, Qiji went to Sichuan via Jingzhou, Gao Jixing (858-929), formally Prince Wuxin of Chu, urged Qiji to stay at Longxing Temple and appointed him as abbot. He died at the age of 76 in Jiangling County, Jingzhou, Hubei.

Works
 Fengsao Zhiyao 
 Bailian Ji

References

External links

863 births
937 deaths
9th-century Chinese poets
10th-century Chinese poets
Chan Buddhist monks
Chinese spiritual writers
Chinese Zen Buddhists
Poets from Hunan
Tang dynasty Buddhist monks
Tang dynasty poets
Writers from Changsha
Zen Buddhism writers